The Women's 50 Breaststroke event at the 11th FINA World Aquatics Championships swam 30 – 31 July 2005 in Montreal, Quebec, Canada. Preliminary and Semifinal heats were swum on 30 July with the heats being held in the morning session and the semifinals being held in the evening session. The final was held on 31 July.

At the start of the event, the existing World (WR) and Championships (CR) records were:
WR: 30.57, Zoë Baker (Great Britain) swum 30 July 2002 in Manchester, UK
CR: 30.64, LUO Xuejuan (China) swum 26 July 2003 in Barcelona, Spain

Results

Preliminary heats

Semifinals

Final

References

Swimming at the 2005 World Aquatics Championships
2005 in women's swimming